Cédric Burdet (born 15 November 1974 in Belley, Ain) is a retired French handball player who played most of his career in French handball team Montpellier HB until his retirement in 2009 (with a national championship victory).

His career with the national team (from 1997 to 2008) included three Olympic Games, including winning the gold medal at the 2008 Summer Olympics, where he was instrumental to the victory of France against Croatia in the semi-finals where he scored 5 goals in the first half, and in the final against Iceland, where he scored 4 goals.

References

External links 
 
 
 

1974 births
Living people
People from Belley
French male handball players
Handball players at the 2000 Summer Olympics
Handball players at the 2004 Summer Olympics
Handball players at the 2008 Summer Olympics
Olympic handball players of France
Olympic gold medalists for France
Montpellier Handball players
Olympic medalists in handball
Medalists at the 2008 Summer Olympics
Sportspeople from Ain
21st-century French people